Henrik Stehlik (born 29 December 1980) is a German trampoline gymnast and three-time Olympic athlete. He competed at the 2004 Summer Olympics in Athens, where he received a bronze medal in the men's trampoline event. Since then he has also competed in the 2008 and 2012 Summer Olympics.  Stehlik was also an active member of German Olympic Sports Federation (DOSB).

Career achievements
 Winner in synchronized trampolining at the 2005 World Games, with Michael Serth
 Olympic bronze medal, 2004
 World Champion for both individual and team trampoline events, 2003 
 European Masters, 2002, 2004, and 2006

References

External links
 
 
 
 

1980 births
Living people
German male trampolinists
Gymnasts at the 2004 Summer Olympics
Gymnasts at the 2008 Summer Olympics
Gymnasts at the 2012 Summer Olympics
Olympic gymnasts of Germany
Olympic bronze medalists for Germany
People from Salzgitter
Olympic medalists in gymnastics
Medalists at the 2004 Summer Olympics
World Games gold medalists
Competitors at the 2005 World Games
Medalists at the Trampoline Gymnastics World Championships
Sportspeople from Lower Saxony
21st-century German people